Harry Boatswain (June 26, 1969 – August 8, 2005) was a professional American football player who played Offensive Tackle for five seasons for the San Francisco 49ers, Philadelphia Eagles, and New York Jets. Harry graduated from the University of New Haven with degrees in both marketing and business administration. He was also a professional wrestler. He died in 2005.

1969 births
American football offensive tackles
New Haven Chargers football players
San Francisco 49ers players
Philadelphia Eagles players
New York Jets players
2005 deaths
Sportspeople from Brooklyn
Players of American football from New York City
Memphis Maniax players